Harvey Comics (also known as Harvey World Famous Comics, Harvey Publications, Harvey Comics Entertainment, Harvey Hits, Harvey Illustrated Humor, and Harvey Picture Magazines) was an American comic book publisher, founded in New York City by Alfred Harvey in 1941, after buying out the small publisher Brookwood Publications. His brothers, Robert B. and Leon Harvey, joined shortly after. The company soon got into licensed characters, which, by the 1950s, became the bulk of their output. The artist Warren Kremer is closely associated with the publisher. 

Harvey Comics' most notable characters are Casper the Friendly Ghost and Richie Rich. Harvey's mascot is named Joker, a harlequin jack-in-the-box character. He was also the mascot of the cartoon shorts series Noveltoons which brought to life many Harvey Comics characters; he also appeared as a cameo in the ending scene of the film Who Framed Roger Rabbit, alongside many other famous cartoon characters.

History

Harvey Comics was founded by the Harvey brothers—Alfred, Leon and Robert—in the 1940s after first acquiring an existing—faltering—title from Brookwood Publications, Speed Comics. The title's headliners were Shock Gibson and Captain Freedom, a patriotic hero like The Shield. Harvey added more anthologies, including Champion Comics and Pocket Comics. From the new titles only one would stay around for a while: The Black Cat, a Hollywood starlet-superhero, which was published into the 1950s.

Harvey began a shift to licensed characters when in 1942 it took over as the radio hero Green Hornet's publisher from Holyoke after six issues. Harvey added additional titles, such that most of their titles were licensed. Licensed characters included Joe Palooka, Blondie, Dick Tracy, and other newspaper strip characters.

The company ultimately became best known for characters it published in comics from 1950s onward, particularly those it licensed from the animation company Famous Studios, a unit of Paramount Pictures, starting in 1951. These include Little Audrey, Casper the Friendly Ghost, Baby Huey, and Herman and Katnip. Harvey also licensed popular characters from newspaper comic strips, such as Mutt and Jeff and Sad Sack. In addition, Harvey developed such original properties as Richie Rich, Little Dot and Little Lotta.

While the company tried to diversify the comics it published, with brief forays in the 1950s and 1960s into superhero, suspense, horror, western and other forms in such imprints as Harvey Thriller and Thrill Adventure, children's comics were the bulk of its output.

On July 27, 1958, Harvey purchased the October 1950 – March 1962 Famous Studio cartoons (including character rights and rights to the cartoon shorts, but excluding Popeye). The Famous cartoons were repackaged and distributed to television as Harveytoons, and Harvey continued production on new comics and a handful of new cartoons produced for television. Casper the Friendly Ghost, who had been Famous' most popular original character, now became Harvey's top draw. Associated characters such as Spooky the Tuff Little Ghost, The Ghostly Trio, Casper's horse Nightmare, Hot Stuff the Little Devil, and Wendy the Good Little Witch were added to the Harvey line.

1980s decline and sale
By the early 1980s, Marvel Comics was in negotiations with Harvey Comics to assume publication of some of their characters. Harvey editor Sid Jacobson, along with the other Harvey staff, were interviewed by Mike Hobson, Marvel's group vice-president of publishing (de facto publisher). As part of the process, Jacobson created several new characters which were well received by Hobson and effectively sealed the deal. Marvel Editor-in-Chief Jim Shooter appointed editor Tom DeFalco as executive editor to coordinate with the Harvey staff, who were hired by Marvel. On the day Marvel was set to take over the Harvey publications, Harvey Comics pulled out of the deal due to an internal disagreement among the two remaining Harvey brothers, Alfred and Leon. Harvey would cease publishing its comics in 1982.

In summer 1984, Steve Geppi (owner of Diamond Comic Distributors and Geppi's Comic World) paid $50,000 for, among other properties, Harvey's entire archive of original art from the Harvey comic Sad Sack. Geppi made this agreement with Steve Harvey, who at the time was president of Harvey Publications Inc., as well as president of Sad Sack Inc., a wholly owned subsidiary of Harvey Publications, Inc.

In 1985 the Marvel imprint Star Comics published a title called Royal Roy. Harvey sued Star for copyright infringement, claiming that Roy was a blatant copy of Richie Rich. (Veteran Harvey writer-artist Lennie Herman had created Royal Roy for Star Comics. Herman died in 1983 before the first issue of Royal Roy was published.) The Royal Roy comic ended after six issues and the lawsuit was dropped.

In 1986, Harvey resumed publication under the leadership of Alan Harvey (Alfred's oldest son), focusing on a few core titles, digests, and reprints.

In 1987, Harvey sued Columbia Pictures, for $50 million, claiming that the Ghostbusters logo used in the 1984 film was too reminiscent of Fatso from the Casper series. The court ruled in Columbia's favor, due to Harvey's failure to renew the copyrights on early Casper stories and the "limited ways to draw a figure of a cartoon ghost".

Harvey Comics Entertainment

In 1989, Harvey was sold to Jeffrey Montgomery's HMH Communications, located in Santa Monica, California. It was renamed Harvey Comics Entertainment (HCE), publishing reprints in the early 1990s as Harvey Classics. In 1993 the company created two imprints, Nemesis  Comics and Ultracomics, to publish Ultraman comics, as well as a couple of other titles. In 1994 Marvel took over publishing and distribution for HCE.

In addition, Montgomery himself began selling a package of older cartoons featuring the characters Harvey had purchased from Paramount to local stations. With Claster Television serving as his distributor, Montgomery launched Casper & Friends in 1990. After the rerun package was pulled in 1994, Montgomery teamed with Carbunkle Cartoons and Film Roman respectively for two new animated series based on Harvey properties. The first, produced by Carbunkle and launching in 1994, featured Baby Huey and the second, produced by Film Roman, was a new Richie Rich cartoon launched in 1996; a previous series had been done without Harvey's involvement other than licensing the character to Hanna-Barbera.

During this period, Montgomery sold 20% of the company to MCA Inc., parent company of Universal Studios for $3 million. (Universal licensed the characters for use in its theme parks.) Montgomery also optioned Richie Rich and Casper for two feature films: Richie Rich was released in 1994 and was a financial flop, while Casper, which was released the following year, became a massive hit.

Montgomery also struck a publishing and distribution deal with Marvel Comics, which led Marvel to publish Casper titles, including an adaptation of the 1995 live-action Casper movie. Two issues of an ongoing Casper title were published in May 1997, followed by the short-lived Casper and Friends Magazine (May–July 1997).

Sunland Entertainment
Montgomery was ousted from HCE in 1997, and in 2001, the company sold its Harvey properties and rights to the Harvey name to Classic Media. HCE was renamed Sunland Entertainment Co. Sunland produced additional films and distribute its library of 150 films and 60 television episodes. In 2000, Harvey bought out PM Entertainment, a home video and film distributor, and after selling it to Classic Media, Roger Burlage held on to PM.

The rights to Sad Sack, Black Cat, and certain other Harvey characters are still owned by Alan Harvey, and have been published under the names of Lorne-Harvey Publications and Re-Collections. In late 2000, Alan Harvey sued Steve Geppi over his 1984 acquisition of the Sad Sack original art, charging that Geppi had plundered Harvey's warehouses. Geppi countersued, claiming that he had legal title to the original art. The suit was settled in late 2002; at the time of the settlement, the New York Supreme Court had dismissed Harvey's claims against Geppi. The settlement agreement allowed Geppi to keep the art, with no money changing hands.

Distribution of cartoons 

For years, the television distribution rights to the Harveytoons library were licensed to Worldvision Enterprises. Worldvision would hold distribution rights to many earlier Famous Studios cartoons (plus most of the cartoons by Fleischer Studios) for a short time, until being absorbed by the television division of Paramount Pictures, which originally distributed the cartoons.

Universal Studios, which owns the pre-1950 Paramount sound features through its television division, once held video rights to the Harvey-owned cartoons, until 2001 when Classic Media obtained the animated catalog. In 2016, rights to the Harvey Comics properties returned to Universal when they acquired Classic Media's parent company, DreamWorks Animation. In 2018, Netflix began airing Harvey Street Kids (later renamed Harvey Girls Forever!), produced by DreamWorks Animation and based on Harvey Comics characters, the series ended in 2020.

Harvey characters

Harvey Girls
 Little Audrey
 Little Dot
 Little Lotta

Casper and his friends 
 Casper the Friendly Ghost
 Spooky the Tuff Little Ghost
 Pearl ("Poil") (Spooky's girlfriend)
 The Ghostly Trio: Stretch, Fatso and Stinkie (Casper's uncles) (Originally as Lazo and Fusso)
 Nightmare the Galloping Ghost (Casper's horse)
 Hot Stuff the Little Devil
 Princess Charma (Hot Stuff’s girlfriend)
 Aunt Clinker (Hot Stuff's aunt)
 Wendy the Good Little Witch
 Witch Sisters: Thelma, Velma and Zelma (Wendy's aunts)

Richie Rich and his friends
 Richie Rich, the Poor Little Rich Boy
 Reginald "Reggie" Van Dough Jr. (Richie Rich's antagonistic cousin)
 Cadbury (Richie Rich's butler)
 Mr. Rich (Richie Rich's father)
 Mrs. Rich (Richie Rich's mother)
 Mayda Munny
 Gloria Glad (Richie Rich's girlfriend)
 Irona (Richie Rich's robot maid)
 Dollar (Richie Rich's dog)
 Freckles and Pee-Wee (Richie Rich's best friends)
 Jackie Jokers the Clown Prince of Show Biz
 Billy Bellhops
 Timmy Time

Other characters
 Baby Huey
 Boys' Ranch (created and owned by Joe Simon and Jack Kirby)
 Bunny (teen girl)
 Buzzy the Crow
 The Cowsills (based on the rock group)
 Flat-Top
 Herman and Katnip
 Mama Duck (Baby Huey's mother)
 Mazie
 Melvin (Little Audrey's boyfriend)
 Modern Madcaps (assorted characters)
 New Kids on the Block (based on the boy band)
 Papa Duck (Baby Huey's father)
 Rags Rabbit
 Sad Sack
 Stumbo the Giant
 Tommy Tortoise and Moe Hare

Harvey superheroes

Golden Age
 Black Cat (Owned by the Harvey estate, not to be confused with the Marvel Comics character of the same name)
 Black Orchid (Not to be confused with the DC Comics character of the same name)
 Blazing Scarab
 Blonde Bomber
 Captain 3-D (owned by Simon and Kirby)
 Captain Freedom
 Clown
 Firebrand (Not to be confused with the DC Comics character of the same name)
 Fly-Man (created by Sam Glanzman)
 Girl Commandoes A multinational team of women soldiers consisting of two American (Captain Pat Parker aka War Nurse and Penelope "Penny" Kirk), one British (Lieutenant Ellen Billing), one Russian (Tanya) and one Chinese (Mei Ling) introduced in Harvey's Speed Comics. They were portraited fighting Nazi and Japanese soldiers in World War II.
 Shock Gibson
 Barry Kuda
 Human Meteor
 Neptina
 Night Hawk
 Pat Parker
 Phantom Sphinx
 Red Blazer
 Red Demon
 Scarlet Arrow
 Scarlet Nemesis
 Scarlet Phantom
 Spirit of '76
 Spitfire (Mahon)
 Stuntman (owned by Joe Simon & Jack Kirby)
 White Mask
 Zebra

Silver Age (Harvey Thriller)
 Bee-Man
 Captain Flower
 Fighting American (A revival of the Prize Comics character, owned by Joe Simon & Jack Kirby)
 Fruitman (owned by Warren Harvey)
 Glowing Gladiator
 Jack Q. Frost
 Jigsaw (owned by Joe Simon)
 Magic Master
 Man in Black
 Miracles, Inc
 Pirana (owned by Joe Simon)
 Sooper Hippie
 Spyman (owned by Joe Simon)
 Tiger Boy (owned by Joe Simon)

Titles

See also
 List of television series and films based on Harvey Comics publications

References

Further reading

External links

 Toonopedia: Harvey Comics

 
American companies established in 1941
American companies disestablished in 1994
Comic book publishing companies of the United States
Defunct comics and manga publishing companies
Publishing companies established in 1941
Publishing companies disestablished in 1994
Defunct companies based in New York City
1941 establishments in New York City
1994 disestablishments in New York (state)
1989 mergers and acquisitions